The Chowan Hawks are the athletic teams that represent Chowan University, located in Murfreesboro, North Carolina, in NCAA Division II intercollegiate sports.

The Hawks compete as members of the Conference Carolinas for 18 of the 21 sports with football and women's bowling as an associate member of the Central Intercollegiate Athletic Association (CIAA). Chowan will begin competition in Acrobatics and Tumbling and Esports in 2020–2021. The Acrobatics and Tumbling program is sanctioned by the National Collegiate Acrobatics and Tumbling Association (NCATA), while Esports is sanctioned through National Association of Collegiate Esports (NACE).

Chowan has been a full member of Conference Carolinas as a full member since the 2019–20 season, and was formerly also a member of the National Christian College Athletic Association and the USA South Athletic Conference of the NCAA's Division III, and the CIAA from 2009–10 to 2018–19.

History
On September 24, 2007, the Central Intercollegiate Athletic Association, established in 1912 and the oldest black athletic conference in United States, announced that Chowan would join the conference for its 2008 football season. Chowan will initially enter the conference to participate in only football. Before the addition of Chowan, the CIAA consisted only of historically African-American institutions of higher education. In joining the CIAA (which sponsors 16 men’s and women’s championships annually), Chowan continues its membership in the National Collegiate Athletic Association (NCAA) Division II. In October 2008, the CIAA Board of Trustees voted to accept Chowan University as a full member of the CIAA. Chowan accepted, and thus became the first non-HBCU member of the CIAA, and will participate in all sports officially for the 2009 fall season.

Varsity teams

List of teams

Men's sports (9)
 Baseball
 Basketball
 Cross country
 Football
 Golf
 Lacrosse
 Soccer
 Swimming
 Tennis

Women's sports (11)
 Acrobatics and Tumbling
 Basketball
 Bowling
 Cross country
 Golf
 Lacrosse
 Soccer
 Softball
 Swimming
 Tennis
 Volleyball

Co-Ed sports (2)
 Cheerleading
 Esports

Individual teams

Football
Coach James Garrison was inducted into the North Carolina Sports Hall of Fame in 2001. He was the Chowan College football coach for 43 years. Coach Garrison won 182 games (third among junior college coaches) and was 7-time Conference Coach of the Year. 35 players were NJCAA All-Americans. The last football team to post a winning record was the 1999 Chowan team which finished 5–4.

Men's basketball
Bob Burke, "all-time winningest coach in Chowan's basketball history," had a 337–124 record.

References

External links